Tipton Airport  is a public airport just south of Fort George G. Meade in Odenton, Anne Arundel County, Maryland. The facility is bordered by Fort Meade, the National Security Agency, and the Patuxent Wildlife Research Center. The airport opened in 1999 on the site of a former United States Army Airfield that was closed in 1995. It is operated by the Tipton Airport Authority.

Facilities and aircraft 

For 12-month period ending April 2, 2008, the airport had 49,225 aircraft operations, an average of 134 per day: 98% general aviation and 2% air taxi. There are 128 aircraft/rotorcraft based at the airport: 85% single-engine, 9% multi-engine and 6% helicopters.

History 
Tipton Airport was originally a military airfield. It was constructed in 1960 over a landfill on the outskirts of Fort Meade and was named Fort George G. Meade Army Airfield. The new airfield replaced a smaller airstrip that had been operating since at least 1935 at a site approximately two miles northeast of Tipton's location (what is now the Fort Meade post exchange and commissary complex). In April 1962, the field was renamed Tipton Army Airfield in honor of Colonel William Tipton, a Maryland National Guard officer and decorated veteran of both world wars. Tipton was killed in an aircraft crash in Ohio at the end of World War II.

Public Law 100–526, the Base Alignment and Closure (BRAC) Act of 1988, designated Tipton Army Airfield for closure, and as a result the land on which Tipton is located was transferred to civilian control in 1995. Following a lengthy environmental remediation, which included the removal of unexploded ordnance and hazardous waste, it was opened to civilian traffic. A formal dedication of Tipton Airport was held on October 27, 1999, and on November 1, 1999, the airport held a grand opening.

References

External links 

Airports in Maryland
Transportation buildings and structures in Anne Arundel County, Maryland
1960 establishments in Maryland